This is a list of the works of the Italian composer Gioachino Rossini (1792–1868).

Operas 
See List of operas by Gioachino Rossini.

Incidental music 
Edipo a Colono (1817)

Cantatas
Il pianto d'armonia sulla morte di Orfeo (1808)
La morte di Didone (1811)
Dalle quete e pallid'ombre (1812)
Egle ed Irene (1814)
L'aurora (1815)
Le nozze di Teti e di Peleo (1816)
Omaggio umiliato (1819)
Cantata... 9 maggio 1819 (1819)
Argene e Melania. Cantata profana per soli, coro e orchestra. Unpublished. First performed as La Riconoscenza - Cantata a quattro voci in 1821.
Giunone (before 1822)
La santa alleanza (1822)
Il vero omaggio (1822)
Omaggio pastorale (1823)
Il pianto delle muse in morte di Lord Byron (1824)
Cantata per il battesimo del figlio del banchiere Aguado (1827)
L'armonica cetra del nune (1830)
Giovanna d'Arco (1832, when it was written with piano accompaniment for Olympe Pélissier; it was revised in 1859 for Marietta Alboni. It is often performed in an orchestral arrangement by Salvatore Sciarrino. It dates from 1989, when it was commissioned by the Rossini Opera Festival, where it was premiered by Teresa Berganza with the conductor Alberto Zedda.)
Cantata in onore del sommo pontefice Pio IX (1847)

Instrumental music
 Sei sonate a quattro (1804)
 Sonata No. 1 in G major
 Sonata No. 2 in A major
 Sonata No. 3 in C major
 Sonata No. 4 in B major
 Sonata No. 5 in E major
 Sonata No. 6 in D major
 Sinfonia "al conventello" (1806)
 Cinque duets pour cor (1806)
 Sinfonia (1808, used in L'inganno felice)
 Sinfonia (1809, used in La cambiale di matrimonio et Adelaide di Borgogna)
 Sinfonia "obbligata a contrabasso" (1807–10)
 Variazzioni di clarinetto (1809)
 Quartetto per flauto, clarinetto, fagotto e corno (1810?) 
 Andante e tema con variazioni (1812)
 Introduction, Theme and Variations for Clarinet and Orchestra (1819)
 Andante e tema con variazioni per arpa e violino (1820)
 Passo doppio 1822 (variations on di tanti palpiti from tancredi)
 Valse (1823)
 Serenata (1823)
 Duetto per Violoncello e Contrabasso (1824)
 Rendez-vous de chasse (1828)
 Fantaisie (1829)
 Trois marches militaires (1837)
 Concerto per fagotto ed orchestra (1845)
 Scherzo (1843)
 Tema originale di Rossini variato per violino da Giovacchino Giovacchini (1845)
 Marcia (1852)
 Thème de Rossini suivi de deux variations et coda par Moscheles père (1860)
 La corona d'Italia (1868)

Sacred music 
Quoniam (1813)
Messa di Gloria (1820)
Preghiera (1820)
Tantum ergo (1824)
Stabat mater (first version 1831, second version 1841)
Trois choeurs religieux ("La foi, l'espérance, la charité," 1844)
Tantum ergo (1847)
O Salutaris Hostia (1857)
Laus deo (1861)
Petite messe solennelle (first version 1863, second version 1867)

Secular vocal music
 Se il vuol la molinara (1801)
 Dolce aurette che spirate (1810)
 La mia pace io già perdei (1812)
 Qual voce, quai note (1813)
 Alla voce della gloria (1813)
 Amore mi assisti (1814)
 Il trovatore (1818)
 Il carnevale di Venezia (Rome, 1821)
 Belta crudele (1821)
 La pastorella (1821)
 Canzonetta spagnuola (1821)
 Infelice ch'io son (1821)
 Addio ai viennesi (1822)
 Dall'oriente l'astro del giorno (1824)
 Ridiamo, cantiamo, che tutto sen va (1824)
 In giorno si bello (London, 1824)
 Tre quartetti da camera (1827)
 Les adieux à Rome (1827)
 Orage et beau temps (1829/30)
 La passeggiata (Madrid, 1831)
 La dichiarazione (1834)
 Les soirées musicales (1830–1835)
 La promessa
 La regata veneziana
 L'invito
 La gita in gondola
 Il rimprovero
 La pastorella dell'Alphi
 La partenza
 La pesca
 La Danza
 La serenata
 L'orgia
 Li marinara
 Deux nocturnes: 1. Adieu a l'Italie, 2. Le départ (1836)
 Nizza (1836)
 L'âme délaissée (1844)
 Francesca da Rimini (1848)
 Mi lagnerò tacendo (1858)

Péchés de vieillesse
Vol I Album italiano
Vol II Album français
Vol III Morceaux réservés
Vol IV Quatre hors-d’œuvre et quatre mendiants
Vol V Album pour les enfants adolescents
Vol VI Album pour les enfants dégourdis
Vol VII Album de chaumière
Vol VIII Album de château
Vol IX Album pour piano, violon, violoncelle, harmonium et cor
Vol X Miscellanées pour piano
Vol XI Miscellanées de musique vocale
Vol XII Quelques riens pour album
Vol XIII Musique anodine
Vol XIV Altri péchés de vieillesse

Wrongly attributed to Rossini
 Duetto buffo di due gatti (The Cat Duet)

References
 

 
Rossini